Every player to appear in Kerry Packer's World Series Cricket is listed below along with their appearance records.  Four teams would take part in the various WSC competitions, Australia XI, West Indies XI, World XI and Cavaliers XI.

WSC Australia XI

WSC West Indies XI

WSC World XI

The following West Indians also represented the World XI in the 1977–78 Supertests
Clive Lloyd (2)
Roy Fredericks (1)
Viv Richards (3)
Wayne Daniel (2)
Gordon Greenidge (3)
Andy Roberts (3)
Joel Garner (2) 

The Following West Indians also represented the World XI in the 1978/79 on the tour of New Zealand
Collis King (7)
Bernard Julien (5)
Albert Padmore (4)
Lawrence Rowe (7) 
World Series Cricket Player Records

WSC Cavaliers XI

The Cavaliers were included as a fourth team for the 1978/79 Country Cavaliers Tour. The XI was selected from players the other three sides had not selected for that rounds fixtures. This gave some of the contracted players who were not regularly appearing the chance to perform and earn bonus/prize money on offer.

Key

Tests – Number of Test Matches played at the end of the player's career

Supertests – Number of World Series Cricket Supertests played

WSC ODIs – Number of World Series Cricket One Day International Matches played; International Cup ODIs (1977/78), International Cup (1978/79), WSC Tour Matches (1978/79 New Zealand), One-day games (1978/79 West Indies). Does not include Country Cup matches, Cavaliers Country Tour, Swan Channel 9 Cup, or other matches played during the WSC era.

References

World Series Cricket